Ruster Santos D'Ajuda (born 24 August 1996), commonly known as Ruster, is a Brazilian footballer who currently plays as a forward for S.C. Olhanense.

Career statistics

Club

Notes

References

1996 births
Living people
Brazilian footballers
Brazilian expatriate footballers
Association football forwards
Campeonato Brasileiro Série B players
Campeonato Brasileiro Série C players
Liga Portugal 2 players
Mogi Mirim Esporte Clube players
Sociedade Esportiva Matonense players
Associação Esportiva Velo Clube Rioclarense players
Mirassol Futebol Clube players
Varzim S.C. players
Portimonense S.C. players
F.C. Penafiel players
Londrina Esporte Clube players
S.C. Olhanense players
Brazilian expatriate sportspeople in Portugal
Expatriate footballers in Portugal